Megacephalomana stygium is a species of moth of the  family Noctuidae (owlet moths). It is found in Madagascar.

This species has a big head, with bipectinated antennaes with a length of 2/3 of the forewings.  Head and chest are black-brown, antennae darkbrown, forewings black-brown with some violet shine and 3 dented transversal lines.
It has a wingspan of 46mm.

References

Megacephalomana
Moths described in 1881
Moths of Madagascar
Moths of Africa